Sir Charles Sedley, 2nd Baronet (c. 1721 – 23 August 1778), was a British politician who sat in the House of Commons between 1747 and 1778.

Sedley was the eldest son of Sir Charles Sedley, 1st Baronet, son of Sir Charles Sedley, illegitimate son of Sir Charles Sedley, 5th Baronet and was educated at Westminster School and University College, Oxford, where he matriculated in 1739. He succeeded his father in 1730, and sat as Member of Parliament for Nottingham from 1747 to 1754 and 1774 to 1778.

Sedley died unmarried in August 1778, when the baronetcy became extinct. He left his estate to an illegitimate daughter, who married Henry Venables-Vernon, afterwards the 3rd Baron Vernon.

References

External links
Information on the Sedley family

Year of birth uncertain
1778 deaths
People educated at Westminster School, London
Alumni of University College, Oxford
Baronets in the Baronetage of England
Members of the Parliament of Great Britain for English constituencies
British MPs 1747–1754
British MPs 1774–1780